Lypsimena strandiella is a species of beetle in the family Cerambycidae. It was described by Stephan von Breuning  in 1943. It is known from Mexico.

References

Pogonocherini
Beetles described in 1943